The historic churches of Sai Kung are Roman Catholic churches and chapels established in the 19th and 20th centuries by missionaries in the Sai Kung Peninsula and surrounding islands, across modern day administrative areas: the Sai Kung District and Sai Kung North of Tai Po District.

History
The churches were established by missionaries from the Seminary of Foreign Missions of Milan (now the Pontifical Institute for Foreign Missions). The first missionary to take up residence in Sai Kung Peninsula, in 1865, was Fr. P. Gaetano Origo (1835-1868). A first chapel was opened in the market town of Sai Kung in the late 1865.

 Hakka villages included: Wong Mo Ying, Yim Tin Tsai
 Punti villages included: Chek Keng, Tai Long Tsuen

The Immaculate Heart of Mary Chapel was built in 1953 in the former village of Sha Tsui (沙咀). It was submerged, together with the village, at the time of the construction of the High Island Reservoir in the 1970s.

List of churches
Note: A territory-wide grade reassessment of historic buildings is ongoing. The churches with a "Not listed" status in the table below are not graded and do not appear in the list of historic buildings considered for grading.

See also
 Roman Catholic Diocese of Hong Kong
 List of Catholic churches in Hong Kong

References

Further reading
 
 (From 23 to 25 November 1871, Count Joseph Alexander Hübner, accompanied by Timoleon Raimondi, visited Christian settlements in the part of China's Xin'an County (Se-non) that would become the New Territories of Hong Kong in 1898.)
 (about a Christian Hakka community in Shung Him Tong Tsuen, Fanling)

External links

 Roman Catholic Churches built in Hong Kong (1842-1969)

Roman Catholic churches in Hong Kong
Sai Kung District
Tai Po District